KZAK-LD, virtual channel 49 (UHF digital channel 35), is a low-powered Nuestra Visión-affiliated television station licensed to Boise, Idaho, United States. The station is owned by Cocola Broadcasting, and was formerly leased by NBC affiliate KTVB (channel 7) for analog retransmission of its then-news focused subchannel.

Digital channels
The station's digital signal is multiplexed:

See also
24/7 (news channel)

References

External links

ZAK-LD
Television channels and stations established in 1993
Low-power television stations in the United States
ATSC 3.0 television stations